Rest Now, Weary Head! You Will Get Well Soon is the debut album by the German indie rock band Get Well Soon released on January 4, 2008 in Germany, Austria and Switzerland on the City Slang record label, in UK and Ireland in June 2008 on Nude and in France in September that year.

The album took three years to produce and was met with mainly positive reviews from most German music magazines. The lyrics were pointed out as a particular strength for their often philosophical and cynical nature. In the UK, NME, Uncut and The Guardian, amongst others, highly rated the album.

The album entered the German Album Charts at 28 and the resulting tour consisting of 19 almost completely sold out shows secured the tour as the most successful newcomer tour in Germany for 2008.

Track listing

Prelude
You/Aurora/You/Seaside
Christmas In Adventure Parks
People Magazine Front Cover
If This Hat Is Missing I Have Gone Hunting
Help To Prevent Forest Fires
I Sold My Hands For Food So Please Feed Me
We Are Safe Inside While They Burn Down Our House
Born Slippy (Nuxx)
Your Endless Dream
Witches! Witches! Rest Now In The Fire
Tick Tack! Goes My Automatic Heart
Lost In The Mountains (Of The Heart)
Coda

2008 albums
Get Well Soon (band) albums